1183 Jutta, provisional designation , is a dark Nysian asteroid and slow rotator from the inner regions of the asteroid belt, approximately 22 kilometers in diameter. It was discovered by German astronomer Karl Reinmuth at the Heidelberg Observatory on 22 February 1930. Any reference of its name to a person is unknown.

Classification and orbit 

This asteroid is a member of the Nysa family, the largest asteroid family that can be divided further into subfamilies with different spectral properties. Jutta orbits the Sun in the inner main-belt at a distance of 2.1–2.7 AU once every 3 years and 8 months (1,344 days). Its orbit has an eccentricity of 0.13 and an inclination of 3° with respect to the ecliptic. The body's observation arc begins at Heidelberg, six days after its official discovery observation.

Physical characteristics

Slow rotator 

In March 2011, a rotational lightcurve of Jutta was obtained from photometric observations by American astronomer Robert Stephens at his Santana Observatory and Goat Mountain Astronomical Research Station in California. Lightcurve analysis gave a rotation period of  hours with a brightness amplitude of 0.10 magnitude. During the same period, French amateur astronomer Pierre Antonini obtained a provisional period of 36 hours, which is now considered incorrect.

While most asteroid have a rotation period between 2 and 20 hours, Jutta is a slow rotator, approximately among the Top 250 slowest ones known to exist. Also, no evidence of a tumbling motion has been found.

Diameter and albedo 

According to the surveys carried out by the Infrared Astronomical Satellite IRAS, the Japanese Akari satellite, and NASA's Wide-field Infrared Survey Explorer with its subsequent NEOWISE mission, Jutta measures between 19.65 and 25.165 kilometers in diameter and its surface has an albedo between 0.03 and 0.045.

The Collaborative Asteroid Lightcurve Link derives a higher albedo of 0.0609 and consequently a shorter diameter of 17.83 kilometers based on an absolute magnitude of 12.4.

Naming 

This minor planet is named after a common German female name. Any reference of this name to a person or occurrence is unknown. The name was suggested by Gustav Stracke.

Unknown meaning 

Among the many thousands of named minor planets, Jutta is one of 120 asteroids, for which no official naming citation has been published.

References

External links 
 Asteroid Lightcurve Database (LCDB), query form (info )
 Dictionary of Minor Planet Names, Google books
 Asteroids and comets rotation curves, CdR – Observatoire de Genève, Raoul Behrend
 Discovery Circumstances: Numbered Minor Planets (1)-(5000) – Minor Planet Center
 
 

001183
Discoveries by Karl Wilhelm Reinmuth
Named minor planets
001183
19300222